Telezhyonka is a village in Yasnogorsky District of Tula Oblast, Russia.
 Latitude: 54 ° 31'00 North Latitude
 Longitude: 37 ° 37'00 East Longitude
 Height above sea level: 251 m

References

Rural localities in Tula Oblast